The flag of Adjara is a flag of Georgia's autonomous republic of Adjara. It displays seven dark blue and white stripes, with the national flag of Georgia shown in canton. The dark blue stripes symbolize the Black Sea and the white stripes symbolize purity. The flag was adopted on 20 July 2004 by the Supreme Council of Adjara. It also bears some similarities to the Flag of Greece.

History

Republic of Batumi 

During the short British administration in the capital of Adjara Batumi there was a self-governing organization called the Republic of Batumi. The republic had its seal, with palm trees in a wreath. The flag had a seal on a red background.

Adjarian ASSR 

Under the Soviet Union, the Adjarian Autonomous Soviet Socialist Republic (AASSR) had its own flag between 1921 and 1950 and again between 1978 and 1991. This consisted of a motif very similar to that of the parent Georgian Soviet Socialist Republic, plus the initials of the AASSR in Georgian.

Autonomous Republic of Ajara (2000-2004) 

Between June 2000 and July 2004, a different flag was used by the government of Aslan Abashidze. The blue background represents the Black Sea, while the seven stars represent Ajaria's two cities (Batumi and Kobuleti) and five districts (Batumi, Kobuleti, Keda, Shuakhevi, Khulo). Party Democratic Union for Revival to which Abashidze belonged used a similar flag with more stars.

Autonomous Republic of Ajara (2004-present) 

The flag ratified by the Supreme Council of the autonomous republic on July 20, 2004. Seven stripes represent administrative units, blue symbolizes the sea, white symbolizes purity. In the canton, the new flag of Georgia.

References

Sources 
 Flags of the World

See also 
Coat of arms of Adjara

Adjara
Ajaria
Adjara
Adjara